Red Oak is an unincorporated community in Charlotte County, Virginia, United States. Red Oak has a post office with ZIP code 23964, which opened on July 31, 1839. The Salem School and the Toombs Tobacco Farm, both of which are listed on the National Register of Historic Places, are located in Red Oak.

References

Unincorporated communities in Charlotte County, Virginia
Unincorporated communities in Virginia